The Parker House is a building located in Sea Girt, New Jersey that was built . The  establishment has been in operation since May 22, 1880, when it opened as a hotel with capacity for one-hundred guests. The establishment gained a summer-season liquor license in 1935 and it remains in operation as a summer-season bar, restaurant, and nightclub through the present day.

History 
The Parker House began operation in 1880 under the proprietorship of Thomas Devlin, a Manasquan resident who had established a reputation as a quality chef. On May 7, 1880, unable to choose a name on his own, Devlin chose to name his new hotel by drawing names from a hat. Mrs. Thomas Devlin had placed the name of "Parker" into the hat in a nod to Joel Parker, a governor of New Jersey who served during the American Civil War; Mr. Devlin drew the name by chance. The Parker House opened for business on May 22, 1880, having a capacity to hold about one-hundred guests. Early on, it served a variety of roles in addition to being a hotel, such as briefly hosting Catholic Mass in its parlor during the early 1880s.

Mr. Devlin would continue to run the operation through April 1894, when he died following a protracted illness. His widow would later take over the operation of the business. By the summer of 1925, however, the Parker House had been renamed to the Arnold Hotel and transferred to D. L. Arnold. It did not remain in the possession of Arnold for long; the Arnold Hotel was purchased by P. and T. Lindgren, who restored the hotel's name to the Parker House for the summer season of 1930.

The year following the end of prohibition, the Parker House was granted a liquor license. Following a change in the liquor laws of the Borough of Sea Girt allowing hotels to possess liquor licenses for the summer season, the business acquired its seasonal retail consumption liquor license in 1935. The Parker House maintains a seasonal liquor license through the present day.

The building and business was sold in 1978 from its owners to a trio of business partners: Henry Wright, Jay Pandolfe, and Frank Matthews. Shortly prior to their purchase of the establishment, the original leather-bound guest book of the Parker House hotel was stolen. Shortly after the trio purchased the establishment, the Borough of Sea Girt sought to restrict the sorts of live music that could be played after receiving noise complaints by town residents, passing an ordinance to ban disco and rock bands in 1979. The Parker House's owners contested the ordinance in court, and the ordinance's genre-specific ban was later struck down by New Jersey Superior Court Judge Patrick J. McGann Jr., who labeled the ordinance as "silly".

Facilities

Bar and restaurant 
During the summer, the Parker House offers season-long room rentals, and is operated as a bar and restaurant. There are bars on the main floor, the Parker House's back porch and in facility's basement; the black-and-white-tiled main floor has capacity to hold up to 334 standing patrons, the outdoor back porch has capacity to hold up to 141, and the hardwood-floored basement of the facility—the Parker Tavern, also called God's Basement—can hold up to 517. The outdoor porch contains a raw bar, while the basement is the frequent location of live musical entertainment during the summer months. The New York Times stated in a 2017 review of the Parker House that, while the atmosphere of the Parker House is relaxed during the daytime, the building becomes a "throbbing epicenter of summer parties" in the evenings. The cash-only establishment's ten bars, manned on weekends by seventeen bartenders, close at 11:30 P.M.—a relatively early closing time for establishments of this sort down the Jersey Shore. 

The "Spring Laker", a cocktail composed of red bull, vodka, and pineapple juice, is the Parker House's signature drink.

Summer rentals 
While the Parker House does not function as a hotel, The Parker House thirty-two rooms for rent when in-season—between Memorial Day and Labor Day— are present on its two uppermost floors . Six of these rooms have private bathrooms, while the remainder have access to communal bathrooms. The New York Times listed the price of the rentals as being between $3,800 and $4,200 in 2017.

Exterior and surroundings 
The Parker House takes the form of a mansion built in the Victorian style. The building itself is adorned with white-painted wood siding. The building is surrounded by a residential neighborhood and the building's commercial use predates the area's modern zoning regulations.

Notes

References 

Sea Girt, New Jersey
Buildings and structures in Monmouth County, New Jersey
1880 establishments in New Jersey
Buildings and structures completed in 1878
Jersey Shore
Defunct hotels in New Jersey